Lohrabad is a village in Piro block of Bhojpur district, Bihar, India. It is located a short distance west of Piro. As of 2011, its population was 1,601, in 197 households.

References 

Villages in Bhojpur district, India